WTNS (1560 AM) is a radio station  broadcasting a country music format. Licensed to Coshocton, Ohio, United States, the station is owned by Coshocton Broadcasting Co.

History
WTNS received its operating license December 30, 1947.

References

External links

TNS
TNS
Radio stations established in 1947
1947 establishments in Ohio